In enzymology, a difructose-anhydride synthase is an enzyme that catalyzes the chemical reaction

bis-D-fructose 2',1:2,1'-dianhydride + H2O  inulobiose

Thus, the two substrates of this enzyme are bis-D-fructose 2',1:2,1'-dianhydride and H2O, whereas its product is inulobiose.

This enzyme belongs to the family of hydrolases, specifically those glycosidases that hydrolyse O- and S-glycosyl compounds.  The systematic name of this enzyme class is bis-D-fructose 2',1:2,1'-dianhydride fructohydrolase. This enzyme is also called inulobiose hydrolase.

References

 
 

EC 3.2.1
Enzymes of unknown structure